The knockout stage of the 1991 FIFA Women's World Cup was the second and final stage of the competition, following the group stage. It began on 24 November with the quarter-finals and ended on 30 November 1991 with the final match, held at the Tianhe Stadium in Guangzhou. A total of eight teams (the top two teams from each group, along with the two best third-placed teams) advanced to the knockout stage to compete in a single-elimination style tournament.

All times listed are local, CST (UTC+8).

Format
In the knockout stage, if a match was level at the end of 80 minutes of normal playing time, 20 minutes of extra time was played (two periods of 10 minutes each). If still tied after extra time, the match was decided by a penalty shoot-out to determine the winner.

The quarter-final match-ups depended on the two third-placed teams which qualified. FIFA set out the following schedule for the semi-finals:
 Match 23: Winner Match 19 v Winner Match 20
 Match 24: Winner Match 21 v Winner Match 22

The third place play-off match-up was:
 Match 25: Loser Match 23 v Loser Match 24

The final match-up was:
 Match 26: Winner Match 23 v Winner Match 24

Combinations of matches in the quarter-finals
In the quarter-finals, all matches were played on 24 November 1991. The specific match-ups and schedule depended on which two third-placed teams qualified for the quarter-finals:

Qualified teams
The top two placed teams from each of the three groups, plus the two best-placed third teams, qualified for the knockout stage.

Bracket

Quarter-finals

Denmark vs Germany

China PR vs Sweden

Norway vs Italy

United States vs Chinese Taipei

Semi-finals

Sweden vs Norway

Germany vs United States

Third place play-off

Final

References

External links
FIFA Women's World Cup China PR 1991, FIFA.com

1991 FIFA Women's World Cup
1991
China at the 1991 FIFA Women's World Cup
Chinese Taipei at the 1991 FIFA Women's World Cup
Denmark at the 1991 FIFA Women's World Cup
Germany at the 1991 FIFA Women's World Cup
Italy at the 1991 FIFA Women's World Cup
Norway at the 1991 FIFA Women's World Cup
Sweden at the 1991 FIFA Women's World Cup
United States at the 1991 FIFA Women's World Cup